Banta Soda, or Banta (Hindi: बंटा), also Goli Soda or Goti Soda and Fotash Jawl, is a popular carbonated lemon or orange-flavoured soft drink sold in India since the late 19th century in a distinctly shaped iconic Codd-neck bottle. The pressure created by the carbonated liquid seals the bottle by forcing a glass marble up into the neck of the bottle where it snugly locks into a rubber gasket. Opening the bottle by pressing on the marble thus releasing the pressurised gas is seen to be a fun experience. The drink is easily available at street-sellers, known as bantawallahs, at prices ranging from  – . The drink is sold in glass tumblers and plastic cups, and used to be served in kulhars (traditional small earthen pots).

Due to the continued popularity, the bottle and drink have become part of Indian popular culture. The drink, which is highly in demand during April–May summer months, is often sold mixed with lemon juice, crushed ice, chaat masala and kala namak (black salt) as a carbonated variant of popular traditional lemonades shikanjvi or jal-jeera. The Banta Soda is popular in Delhi, Punjab and Uttar Pradesh; and its variation the Panneer Soda, which is mixed with rose essence, is popular in Tamil Nadu and Andhra Pradesh. In Delhi it is known as "Delhi's local drink", where it remains popular, especially in Old Delhi and the Delhi University college campuses. Pandit Ved Prakash Lemon Wale near Town Hall in Chandni Chowk in Old Delhi, has been selling this drink since the 1870s.

Due to its popularity, it is also available in "fancy" bars, and commercially mass-manufactured versions in several flavours are also available in cafes, bars and five star hotels.

Background

Etymology

The drink gets its name from the marble in the Codd-neck bottle. The marble in Hindi and Punjabi is known as the banta, goli, goti, kancha, etc., hence the names, Banta Soda  and Goti Soda – as the drink is known in North India, and the Goli Soda – as the drink is known in South India. In Delhi, it is also called the kanchay waali drink or nimbu soda. Fotash Jawl is the Bengali name for this drink.

History 

The Codd-neck bottle, named after its inventor Hiram Codd who patented it in 1872, was specially designed for lemonade and fizzy beverages. Since children often smashed the bottles to get to the marble inside, old Codd-neck bottles are cherished collector's items. Until the 1900s, when the manufacturing of these bottles started in India, the bottles were imported from Britain. Prior to India's independence in 1947, the bottles were banned in several cities during the Indian independence movement as the Indian freedom fighters added chuna (calcium hydroxide) to the soda bottles for making improvised mini cannons.

In 1950s, banta soda was sold on horse-drawn carts which also carried the soda-making equipment.

Production process 

Ingredients such as salt and water are mixed with the flavours using either the fresh fruit juice or commercial flavours, which is then poured into a Codd-neck bottle using a funnel until the bottle is full. The bottle is placed into the soda-making machine, which grips the bottle firmly in a container, and a nozzle from the machine snugly closes the mouth of the bottle and infuses it with carbon dioxide, after which the container which holds the bottle is rotated two or three times to further diffuse the carbon dioxide which pushes the marble up the neck of bottle against the gasket at the top, thus sealing the bottle. Bottles are reusable and are collected by the bottlers to be cleaned, washed, steamed or sanitised, and then refilled

Present-day

Like , a drink available in Japan, banta soda in India is also available in a Codd-neck bottle, a heavy glass bottle whose mouth is sealed by a round marble (instead of a cap) thanks to the pressure of the carbonated contents. The distinctive bottle has led to the drink also being called goli soda in South India.

Codd-neck bottle manufacturers 

Prior to India's independence the Codd-neck bottles were imported from England. However, post-independence local manufacturers came up, including many factories in Ahmedabad, all of which have now stopped making Codd-neck bottles. Presently, Khandelwal Glass Works, who has been making these bottles since 1981 at Sasni in Uttar Pradesh, is the sole manufacturer of Codd-neck bottles in India after their competitor Mahalakshmi Glass Works in Hyderabad closed down a few years ago. Before the re-entry of popular soft drinks, like Pepsi and Coca-Cola in 1993, the sale of Banta reached its peak in the early 1990s, selling 100,000 bags per annum, with each bag containing 75 bottles. By 2010, however, the sales had dropped by nearly half.

Soda bottling units

During the bottling process, a chemical flavouring agent known as Lemon No. 1 by International Flavors & Fragrances (IFF) is added. The agent is also used in ice cream and by the pharmaceutical industry.

In 2017, Delhi had over 100 single-room bottling units. In 1970s, Chennai had 150 goli soda bottling units in the unorganised sector which had dropped to 50 by 2018.

Chennai-based Kozzmo Beverages, which started its operations in 2018, has started making commercial pre-packaged hygienic goli soda using a manufacturing unit certified by the Food Safety and Standards Authority of India (FSSAI). It sells 6 flavours – paneer soda, nimbu masala, lemon, orange, grape, and pineapple.

Spark Premium Codd Soda introduced the first premium branded goli soda in Telangana. Mohammed Abdul Khader, who started manufacturing Spark Goli Soda in 2019 says it took him two years to get into selling business-to-business. On the disappearance of goli soda, he says, "One factor was the traditional filling system. It was cumbersome and needed a lot of manpower. The expensive production method contributed to its disappearance. After the development of new semi-automatic filling machines with modern technology. it made a comeback."

See also

 
 Shikanjvi
 List of Indian drinks

Notes

References

External links 
 Banta Soda in popular culture.

Citrus sodas
Lemon-lime sodas
Carbonated drinks
Indian drinks
Culture of Delhi